Y is the second EP by South Korean boy band MBLAQ, and was released through J.Tune Entertainment South Korea on May 17, 2010. The only single "Y" was released to Korean music portals on the same date as the EP release. The album is labeled as a "single-album" (single or maxi single) in Korea, however, the album falls into the category of an EP (extended play or mini album), and technically does not qualify as a single.

Track listing

Music videos and singles
 "Y" was the only single to be released from the boys follow up EP.  The teaser was officially released on 13 May 2010 in South Korea.  The full music video was released at midnight on 19 May 2010.  The boys received some back lash after Joon's character held a gun to his girlfriend and shot her in the music video.  The boy's label responded with an apology, and a statement stating they would remove the scene.
 "One Better Day" was also performed during promotions for "Y". The boys officially started promoting "One Better Day" on 20 May 2010, back to back with "Y". The song was never released as a single, nor was a music video produced.

References

External links
 MBLAQ's Official Site

2010 EPs
MBLAQ EPs
Korean-language EPs